Kenneth Gaw (born September 1970) is a Hong Kong businessman.

Early life
Gaw was born in September 1970 to Anthony Gaw and Rosanna Wang in Bangkok, Thailand, and grew up in Hong Kong.

Education
Gaw has a bachelor's degree in Applied Mathematics and Economics from Brown University, graduating in 1992.

Career
After graduating in 1992, Gaw worked for Goldman Sachs in  New York.

In 1994, Gaw joined Pioneer Global Group, a company founded by his late father and chaired by his mother.

Gaw is the managing director of Pioneer Global Group. Gaw owns 10% of Pioneer Global.

Gaw is the president and managing principal of Gaw Capital Partners, and a director of Dusit Thani, Home Inns and the Hong Kong Thailand Business Council.

In 2015, the Gaw family had an estimated net worth of US$1.5 billion.

Personal life
Kenneth Gaw and his wife, Patricia, have three sons.

References

External links 
 Pioneer Global Group Ltd (with Executive Leadership) at Reuters

1970 births
Living people
Gaw family
Hong Kong billionaires
Brown University alumni